

Estelle v. Gamble, 429 U.S. 97 (1976), was a case in which the Supreme Court of the United States established the standard of what a prisoner must plead in order to claim a violation of Eighth Amendment rights under 42 U.S.C. § 1983. Specifically, the Court held that a prisoner must allege acts or omissions sufficiently harmful to evidence deliberate indifference to serious medical needs. Though the Court credited Gamble's complaint that doctors had failed to provide appropriate care, it held that medical malpractice did not rise to the level of "cruel and unusual punishment" simply because the victim is a prisoner.

History
J. W. Gamble was a state prisoner within the Texas Department of Corrections who was given a prison labor assignment loading and unloading cotton bales from a truck.  On November 9, 1973, he injured his back when a cotton bale fell on him.  Over the next three months, he complained of back and chest pains, was subject to administrative segregation for refusing to work, and ultimately was treated for an irregular heartbeat. 

On February 11, 1974, Gamble initiated his lawsuit pro se by submitting a handwritten document.

The Court found for the defendant because it viewed his failure to receive proper medical care as "inadvertent". The case nevertheless established the principle that the deliberate failure of prison authorities to address the medical needs of an inmate constitutes "cruel and unusual punishment". It held that "deliberate indifference to serious medical needs of prisoners constitutes the 'unnecessary and wanton infliction of pain'...proscribed by the Eighth Amendment."

Helling v. McKinney

The Supreme Court in 1993 extended the requirement that inmates receive required medical care beyond what it established in Estelle. In Helling v. McKinney, the Court considered the case of a Nevada prisoner, "the cellmate of a five-pack-a-day smoker," who sought to be housed in an environment free of second-hand smoke. McKinney suffered from no ailment and sought no medical treatment. Justice Byron White wrote for a 7−2 majority of the Court that McKinney's claim that prison officials "have, with deliberate indifference, exposed him to levels of ETS [second hand smoke] that pose an unreasonable risk of serious damage to his future health" raised a valid claim under the Eighth Amendment. He wrote that McKinney would have to prove both the scientific facts of the dangers of exposure to second-hand smoke and prove that community standards supported him, that "it violates contemporary standards of decency to expose anyone unwillingly to such a risk. In other words, the prisoner must show that the risk of which he complains is not one that today's society chooses to tolerate." He would also have to prove that prison officials acted with deliberate indifference.

See also 
 List of United States Supreme Court cases involving mental health
 DeShaney v. Winnebago County
 Farmer v. Brennan
 Davis v. City of Las Vegas (9th Cir. 2007)

Notes

External links

 

United States Supreme Court cases
United States Supreme Court cases of the Burger Court
1976 in United States case law
Cruel and Unusual Punishment Clause case law
Medical lawsuits
Medical malpractice
Penal system in the United States